Air Chief Marshal Soebandrio (born 22 March 1953 in Bandung) was the Chief of Staff of the Indonesian Air Force. He took over from Air Marshal Herman Prayitno on 28 December 2007, and was replaced by Air Chief Marshal Imam Sufaat on 7 November 2009. He served as an F-4 fighter pilot in the East Timor War. He was promoted to Staff Colonel in 1992 and was the ADC (Aide-de-Camp) to President Suharto between 1994 and 1998. He later commanded the 15th Bomber Group and 11th Electronics Warfare Brigade. He was trained in Israel and Taiwan.

References
 Biography of Air Marshal Soebandrio
 Profile of Soebandrio

|-
 

1953 births
Living people
People from Bandung
Indonesian Air Force air marshals
Chiefs of Staff of the Indonesian Air Force